CESG may refer to:

 Communications-Electronics Security Group, a group within the UK Government Communications Headquarters (GCHQ)
 Canada Education Savings Grant, a Government of Canada program